Jozef Thana (born 14 February 1988 in Shkodër) is an Albanian professional footballer who most recently played for Shënkolli in the Albanian First Division.

References

External links
 Profile - FSHF

1988 births
Living people
Footballers from Shkodër
Albanian footballers
Association football midfielders
Albania under-21 international footballers
KF Skënderbeu Korçë players
KF Elbasani players
KF Teuta Durrës players
FK Partizani Tirana players
FK Kukësi players
KF Laçi players
FK Dinamo Tirana players
KF Shënkolli players
Kategoria Superiore players
Kategoria e Parë players